Çay District is a district of Afyonkarahisar Province of Turkey. Its seat is the town Çay. Its area is 803 km2, and its population is 30,777 (2021).

Composition
There are three municipalities in Çay District:
 Çay
 Karamıkkaracaören
 Pazarağaç

There are 20 villages in Çay District:

 Akkonak
 Armutlu
 Aydoğmuş
 Bulanık
 Çayırpınar
 Çayıryazı
 Cumhuriyet
 Deresinek
 Devederesi
 Eber
 Göcen
 İnli
 Kadıköy
 Karamık
 Kılıçyaka
 Koçbeyli
 Maltepe
 Orhaniye
 Pınarkaya
 Yeşilyurt

References

External links
 District governor's official website 

Districts of Afyonkarahisar Province